Vladislav Nikolayevich Mayorov (born 12 November 1976) is a former Russian professional footballer.

Honours
 Ukrainian Premier League bronze: 1999.

External links
 

1976 births
Sportspeople from Ryazan
Living people
Russian footballers
Association football midfielders
Russian Premier League players
Ukrainian Premier League players
Russian expatriate footballers
Expatriate footballers in Ukraine
FC Zhemchuzhina Sochi players
FC Kryvbas Kryvyi Rih players
FC Spartak Ryazan players
FC Spartak-MZhK Ryazan players